The church of Madonna delle Grazie is a Roman Catholic Marian shrine located in the town limits of Gualdo, province of Macerata, in the region of Marche, Italy.

History
Founded in the 12th century, the shrine has undergone numerous refurbishments. It conserves a venerated 12th-century fresco depicting the Madonna delle Grazie. the Portico has a two-story portico, the base with stone rounded arches. In the 16th century, a Franciscan monastery arose adjacent to the church, but was abandoned by the Frati Minori after the Napoleonic invasions. The cloister has arcades around a central well.

See also
Catholic Church in Italy

References

12th-century Roman Catholic church buildings in Italy
Romanesque architecture in le Marche
Gualdo
Gualdo